was a town located in Fuji District, Shizuoka Prefecture, Japan.

As of 2009, the town had an estimated population of 9,344 and a density of 126 persons per km². The total area was 74.18 km².

On March 23, 2010, Shibakawa was merged into the expanded city of Fujinomiya and thus no longer exists as an independent municipality. Fuji District was dissolved as a result of this merger.

Geography
Shibakawa is located in central Shizuoka Prefecture, in the southwest foothills of Mount Fuji, and is bordered by the Fuji River. The area has a temperate maritime climate with hot, humid summers and mild, cool winters.

Surrounding municipalities
Shizuoka Prefecture
Shizuoka
Fujnomiya
Fuji
Yamanashi Prefecture
Nanbu, Yamanashi

History
Shibakawa was located in the far eastern portion of former Suruga Province, and was largely tenryō territory under direct control of the Tokugawa shogunate in the Edo period. During the cadastral reform of the early Meiji period in 1889, the area was reorganized into two villages (Yuzuno, Shibafuji) within Fuji District and one village (Uchibo Village) within Ihara District. Uchibo and Shibafuji merged in 1955 to form Fujihara Village, which was renamed Shibakawa in 1956 after it annexed neighboring Yuzuno Village.

Economy
The economy of Shibakawa is largely based on agriculture, and tourism. The town also serves as a bedroom community for the industrial zones in neighboring Fuji.

Transportation

Highways
Japan National Route 52

Rail
JR Central - Minobu Line
 Shibakawa Station, Inako Station

References

External links

 Fujinomiya official website 

Populated places disestablished in 2010
Dissolved municipalities of Shizuoka Prefecture
Fujinomiya, Shizuoka